Ahmed Ali (born 8 August 1988), is an Egyptian footballer who plays for Egyptian Premier League side El Gouna as a right-back.

Career
Ali began his career at local club El Mansoura and made his debut at the age of 17, playing as a right back, right midfielder and also a right winger. During the summer of 2008, Ali joined Egyptian giants Al Ahly and spent 4 years at the club with two of them being on loan at Al Ittihad and Ittihad El Shorta. After finding no place in Al Ahly's squad, he joined another Egyptian Premier League side Misr Lel Makkasa in 2012 and spent two years with the club, appearing in 18 league matches only.

In 2014, before the start of the 2014–15 Egyptian Premier League season, Ali joined Al Mokawloon. He spent 4 seasons with the club and played 115 matches in all competitions, making him one of the longest serving players for the club since their promotion from the Egyptian Second Division in 2005.

On 31 May 2018, after his contract with Al Mokawloon ended, Ali joined newly-promoted side El Gouna on a free transfer.

References

1988 births
Living people
People from Mansoura, Egypt
Egyptian footballers
Association football fullbacks
Egyptian Premier League players
El Mansoura SC players
Al Ahly SC players
Al Ittihad Alexandria Club players
Ittihad El Shorta SC players
Misr Lel Makkasa SC players
Al Mokawloon Al Arab SC players
El Gouna FC players